Ustye-Bassy (Baśıwtamaq) is a rural locality (a village) in Tavakachevsky Selsoviet, Arkhangelsky District, Bashkortostan, Russia. The population was 22 as of 2010. There are 2 streets.

Geography 
Ustye-Bassy is located 11 km northeast of Arkhangelskoye (the district's administrative centre) by road. Gayfullinskoye is the nearest rural locality.

References 

Rural localities in Arkhangelsky District